The Wibault 280-T was a French 12-passenger civil airliner produced by Wibault backed by money from the Penhoët shipyards and also known as 'Penhoët Wibault'.

Design and development
The prototype Penhoët Wibault 280-T first flew at Villacoublay in November 1930 with the development backed by funds from the Penhoët shipyards of St Nazaire. It was an all-metal low-wing cantilever monoplane powered by three 300 hp (224 kW) Hispano-Wright 9Qa radial engines although these were soon replaced by three Gnome-Rhône 7Kb and the aircraft was redesignated the Wibault 281-T. A second aircraft was built to the 281 standard but then it was converted to a Wibault 282-T with three 350 hp (261 kW) Gnome-Rhône 7Kd engines and room for 12 passengers, seven further aircraft were built as 282s. Some of the 282s were operated by Air Union on the Paris-London Voile d'Or ("Golden Clipper") service in 1933. In 1934 Air France took delivery of the first of ten Wibault 283-Ts which had an increased fuel capacity and modified tail. Some of the 282s were converted to 283 standard. Some of the commercial aircraft were later taken over as military transports.

Accidents and incidents
On 9 May 1934, Wibault 282-T F-AMHP of Air France crashed into the English Channel off Dungeness, Kent, United Kingdom, killing all six people on board.
On 19 May 1934, a Golden Clipper of Air France crash-landed on a cricket pitch adjacent to Croydon Airport, Surrey, United Kingdom, due to fuel exhaustion. Only one of the ten people on board was injured.
On 24 December 1937, Wibault-Penhoët 283.T12 (c/n 11) F-AMYD of Air France crashed near Zhůří (currently part of Rejštejn), Czechoslovakia, due to a navigational error. The aircraft was supposed to land at Prague, but was directed by controllers to fly south and crashed in foggy, snowy and dark conditions after . Two pilots and a single passenger were killed.

Variants
Penhoët Wibault 280-T
Prototype with three  Hispano-Wright 9Qa radial engines, one built converted to a 281 and then to a 282.
Wibault 281-T
Prototype with three  Gnome-Rhône 7Kd radial engines. One built as such and one converted from 280-T. Both converted to 282-Ts.
Wibault 282-T
10-passenger production variant with Gnome-Rhône 7Kd engines withcowlings around the wing-mounted engines. Six built from new plus two converted prototypes.
Wibault 283-T
Production variant for Air France with three Gnome-Rhône 7Kd engines, NACA cowlings, increased fuel capacity, higher weights and a modified tail, ten built.

Operators

Air France
Air Union
French Air Force

Aero Portuguesa

Specifications (283-T-12)

Notes

References

External links

"Wings Over Four Continents" Popular Mechanics, December 1935 photo bottom of pg.866, first two photos pg. 867

Trimotors
Low-wing aircraft
1930s French airliners
Wib 280
Aircraft first flown in 1930